Yugapurushan is a 2010 Indian Malayalam-language film about the life and times of Sree Narayana Guru. The movie is directed by R. Sukumaran. It has an ensemble cast led by Mammootty, Thalaivasal Vijay and Siddique.

Production
The film was in the making for more than fifteen years. Sukumaran says this movie was a childhood ambition, a destiny. His devotion to Sree Narayana Guru is what promoted him to make this movie. Over 2000 hand drawn images constitute the story board. Mohanlal was initially cast as "Swami Vivekananda", a cameo role in the movie which comes in the flashback, but later on withdrew from the movie due to problems with his shooting dates. The cast includes some of the best in the Malayalam movie industry.

Plot
The story revolves around the life and teachings of Sree Narayana Guru. Various events in his life like the Aruvikkara movement, Vaikom Satyagraha are detailed. The movie involves two major sub plots which highlights the relevance of the guru and his teachings as well as his love to his fellow beings one where an intercaste couple portrayed by Navya Nair and Kalabhavan Mani fights the caste establishment with the blessings of Gurudevan. Another sub plot involves a family where Jagathy Sreekumar plays a drunken  abusive husband and his wife (Kalpana) who is at the receiving end seeks the Guru's help and finally with the Guru's blessing Jagathy Sreekumar returns to the path of righteousness. The movie consists of four songs penned by Kaithapram Damodaran Namboothiri and two poems by Kumaran Asan.

Cast 
Thalaivasal Vijay as Sree Narayana Guru
Mammootty as K. C. Kuttan
Siddique as Dr. Padmanabhan Palpu
Babu Antony as Ayyankali
Navya Nair as Savithri Antharjanam
Devan as Madhavan
Kalpana
Kalabhavan Mani
Sai Kumar
Jishnu as K. A. Ayyappan
Jagathy Sreekumar
Thampy Antony
Arun as Kochu Thamburan
 Kailas Nath
Subbalakshmi
Hima Shankar as Ponni
 Shobha Mohan
 Kozhikode Sarada
 Cherthala Lalitha
Biju Pappan
Chali Pala
Vijayan Peringode
Devu Krishnan

Release 
Yugapurushan was released in theatres in Kerala on 5 February 2010. The film got great responses from the critics. Though the film wasn't a crowd puller during its initial release, it eventually did have poor box-office  overall.

References

External links 
 

2010 films
2010s Malayalam-language films
History of Kerala on film
Films set in the British Raj